Badr al-Din Tabrizi (fl. 1250–1275) was an Iranian architect and scholar in medieval Anatolia. He is credited with the creation of the tomb of Rumi in Konya.

In all likelihood, like other Iranian craftsmen and scholars, Bad al-Din Tabrizi had come to Anatolia in order to seek safety after the Mongol invasion of Iran in the mid thirteenth century. According to the Manāqeb al-ʿārefīn, a contemporary source written by Shams al-Din Ahmad Aflaki, Badr al-Din Tabrizi also had knowledge of numerous other matters, including "astrology, mathematics, geometry, spells and magic, alchemy, philosophy, and the cultivation of citrus". Aflaki, himself a disciple of Rumi, praised Badr al-Din Tabrizi as "the second Socrates and Greek Plato".

Sources

Further reading
 

13th-century Iranian people
People from the Sultanate of Rum
Iranian architects
Iranian scholars